Mutoni Saranda Oliva (born 2003) is a Rwandan actress and poet.

Early life 
Mutoni is a university student with interests in pursuing a career in hospitality and tourism. Alongside her poetry and studies, Mutoni is also filmmaker with an internet series called Toppline TV, as well as a public speaker as part of Orators Africa, and a campaigner for Rwandan art of peace. Her guiding philosophy is integrity, motivated by people who worked to achieve their objectives. As a result, she seeks to overcome issues in order to have a better future.

On January 14, 2020, Younger Women Mentors Network (YWMNE), presented Mutoni as one of three poets who had been awarded a 'best poem' award for her work in struggle for the rights of young women in Rwanda.

References

Rwandan women poets
Rwandan poets
2003 births
Living people